Paul Robeson - Speak of Me As I Am is a 1998 documentary film directed by Rachel Hermer. It is a co-production of BBC Wales/New Jersey Public Television series produced by Richard Trayler-Smith and Max Pugh, about the life of singer, actor and activist, Paul Robeson. It features rare extensive archival footage of Robeson in the former Soviet Union, including footage of Robeson at Yalta with Nikita Khrushchev and many of Robeson's homes and landmarks as they look today. There are also interviews with Robeson's two main biographers, Lloyd Brown and Martin Duberman. As of 2009, Paul Robeson - Speak of Me As I Am is the most extensive documentary on Paul Robeson that the BBC has ever been involved with.

Cast
 Paul Robeson
 Pam Grier (narrator)
 Martin Duberman
 Lloyd Brown
 Oscar Peterson, Jr.
 Sterling Stuckey
 Jefferey C. Stewart

External links
The Paul Robeson Foundation, Inc.

Works about Paul Robeson
1998 television films
1998 films
1998 documentary films
1990s English-language films